Decision aids are interventions or tools designed to facilitate shared decision making and patient participation in health care decisions.

Decision support interventions help people think about choices they face; they describe where and why choice exists; and they provide information about options, including, where reasonable, the option of taking no action. These interventions aim to help people to deliberate, independently or in collaboration with others, about options by considering relevant attributes to help them forecast how they might feel about short, intermediate and long-term outcomes which have relevant consequences. Decision aids can be of any type but are most commonly pamphlets, videos, or web-based tools. Decision aids support the process of constructing preferences and eventual decision making, appropriate to their individual situation.

Usage
There are numerous ways in which decision aids can be used. They can be brief enough to be used during a clinical encounter or they can have sufficient content to be used  before or after clinical encounters. Although decision aids have been available since the early 1980s, evidence suggests that they are not well integrated into routine practice.

Efficacy
Decision aids provide people with a greater understanding of their medical treatment options and empower people to participate in their own health decision making. Supplementing patient-education consultations with decision tools improves people's knowledge about the risks and benefits of a procedure or medication and may help them make decisions that are in line with their personal values.

No adverse effects have been identified.

It is not clear what type of decision aid for patients is cost-effective. It is also not clear what impact the use of clinical decision aid systems that assist people who face healthcare treatments or screening decisions may have on the overall healthcare system. It is not known if decision aids are helpful for people who are not strong readers.

Producers
There are also many active research groups in the field, including the University of Ottawa, Dartmouth College, Cardiff University and Hamburg; the Agency for Healthcare Research and Quality uses the IPDAS standards to produce its decision aids.

While researchers and health care facilities have different approaches to producing these decision aids, engaging patients in the process appears to have benefits. Results of a systematic review of the literature found that involving users in the design and development of these tools, from the needs assessment, through reviewing the content during development, and into prototyping, piloting, and usability testing, benefits the overall process.

Standards
There has been an increase in use of decision support and a global interest in developing these interventions among both for-profit and not-for-profit organisations. It is therefore essential to have internationally accepted standards to assess the quality of their development, process, content, potential bias and method of testing and evaluation. The International Patient Decision Aids Standards (IPDAS) Collaboration has published a checklist, and, more recently, an assessment instrument (IPDAS) to evaluate the quality of decision support interventions. In its November 2013 issue, BMC Medical Informatics and Decision Making published a supplement that described the 10-year evolution of the IPDAS Collaboration and 12 core dimensions for assessing the quality of patient decision aids. While specifying minimum standards for patient decision support interventions is a feasible development, it is unclear whether the minimum standards can be applied to interventions designed for use within clinical encounters and to those that target screening and diagnostic tests.

References

External links 
 IPDASi

Decision-making
Health care